Stephanie Josepha Friederike Wilhelmine Antonia of Hohenzollern-Sigmaringen (15 July 1837 – 17 July 1859) was Queen of Portugal from her marriage to King Peter V on 18 May 1858 until her death the following year.

Family
Born in Krauchenwies Castle in Krauchenwies, Sigmaringen, in 1837, Stephanie was the eldest daughter of Prince Karl Anton of Hohenzollern, head of the House of Hohenzollern-Sigmaringen, and his wife Princess Josephine of Baden. Her maternal grandparents were Karl, Grand Duke of Baden, and Stéphanie de Beauharnais, adopted daughter of Napoleon.

She was also a younger sister of Prince Leopold of Hohenzollern, older sister of King Carol I of Romania, and aunt of King Albert I of Belgium.

Marriage

Stephanie married King Peter V of Portugal by proxy on 29 April 1858 at St. Hedwig's Cathedral in Berlin, where her eldest brother Leopold stood in for the groom. She was then married in person on 18 May 1858 at the Church of St. Dominic in Lisbon. Both bride and groom were a few months short of their twenty-first birthdays. Stephanie was received with much luxury and wrote home that the Portuguese understood luxury better than dignity. During her short period as queen, she made herself a good name from the foundation of hospitals.

There were no children from this marriage. Stephanie fell ill with diphtheria and died only a year later in Lisbon at the age of 22.  Her body was interred at the Braganza Pantheon inside the Monastery of São Vicente de Fora in Lisbon.

Pedro never married again and died of cholera on 11 November 1861. He was succeeded by his younger brother Luís.

Archives
Stephanie's letters from Portugal to her mother, Josephine of Baden, between 1858 and 1859 are preserved in the Hohenzollern-Sigmaringen family archive, which is in the State Archive of Sigmaringen (Staatsarchiv Sigmaringen) in the town of Sigmaringen, Baden-Württemberg, Germany.

Stephanie's letters from Portugal to her brother, Leopold of Hohenzollern-Sigmaringen, between 1858 and 1859 are also preserved in the State Archive of Sigmaringen (Staatsarchiv Sigmaringen).

References

External links

1837 births
1859 deaths
Burials at the Monastery of São Vicente de Fora
Deaths from diphtheria
Stephanie
Dames of the Order of Saint Isabel
Infectious disease deaths in Portugal
Respiratory disease deaths in Portugal
People from Sigmaringen (district)
Portuguese queens consort
Stephanie
19th-century Portuguese people
19th-century Portuguese women
Daughters of monarchs